Kaş is a small fishing, diving, yachting and tourist town, and a district of Antalya Province of Turkey, 168 km west of the city of Antalya. As a tourist resort, it is relatively unspoiled.

History 
Although the Teke peninsula has been occupied since the Stone Age, it seems Kaş was founded by the Lycians, and its name in Lycian language was Habesos or Habesa. It was a member of the Lycian League, and its importance during this time is confirmed by the presence of one of the richest Lycian necropoleis.

In the Hellenistic period and under the Roman Empire it served as the port of Phellus. For information on its history at that time and on its archaeological remains, see the article on Antiphellus, the name by which it was known at that time.

The town suffered because of Arab incursions, then was annexed (under the name of Andifli) to the Anatolian Sultanate of Rum, led by the Seljuks. After the demise of the Seljuks, it came under the Ottomans.

In 1923, because of the forcible exchange of populations between Greece and Turkey after the Greco-Turkish War, population of Greek origin in the area left for Greece.

In the early 1990s tourism started booming in Kaş, with visitors mainly from the UK and Germany. This growth of tourism brought an explosion in apartment building (often without license), which is seriously threatening the landscape and the environment. Particularly affected is the Çukurbağ Peninsula, west of the town, which now has luxury hotels built on it.

Geography 
As the tenth largest district of Antalya as of 2021, Kaş is on a hill running down to the Turquoise Coast of southwestern Turkey. The district has a typical Mediterranean climate of hot, dry summers and mild, wet winters, which allows the growth of oranges, lemons and bananas. The lowland areas are also planted with cut flowers and a variety of fruits and vegetables. Many are grown all year round under glass. The hillsides produce honey and almonds, while at high altitudes there are extensive pine forests. The weather is drier at high altitudes. Although agriculture is still important, tourism is the main source of income in the district, which has many hotels and guest houses.

Villages

Tourism 
The tourist industry is centered on the pleasant town of Kaş, but many other coastal towns and villages in the district have plenty of accommodation for visitors including Kalkan and Gelemiş. The district can be reached from both Antalya and Dalaman airports, as there is no airport in Kaş.

Kaş itself is a quiet pleasant town with its turquoise blue sea and narrow streets scented with jasmine flowers. There are plenty of little guest houses, quiet cafes serving home cooking, or small bars to relax and listen to live music after a day's scuba diving. Kaş has an annual arts festival, jazz concerts in the Hellenistic theatre and the Kiln Under the Sea arts collective have held underwater ceramics exhibitions here.

Kaş is one of the leading spots for scuba diving in Turkey. Its visited by beginners as well as advanced divers. There are more than 15 dive centers and diving schools, mostly located at the local port. They offer guided diving trips to the 50 dive spots in the vicinity. Diving in Kaş offers an array of fish and other sea creatures like octopus and sea turtles.

Besides the biological diversity, Kaş offers a vast variety of underwater cultural heritage. Among various wreck sites, six artificial wrecks are worth visiting. These wrecks are submerged to create artificial reefs and touristic diving spots. There are two historically important wreck sites, an airplane from World War II and a cargo ship from the 1950s sunk near the small islands in the extremities of Kaş. One last important diving spot is the "Kaş Archaeopark Site", an experimental archaeology project conducted by the Underwater Research Society (Sualtı Araştırmaları Derneği-SAD) in 2006. In this scientific project, an interpretative reconstruction of the Uluburun wreck and its cargo is placed underwater.

Outdoor sport activities attract the more adventurous visitors of Kas, especially small group holidays from Europe and independent travellers. Popular adventures include: 
Sea Kayaking at Kekova
Mountainbiking the backcountry
Trekking the Lycian Way
Canyoning in the Kibris Canyon

On Fridays, Greek visitors from Kastelorizo visit the markets of Kaş, including the central city market full local products and produce grown in the surrounding villages.

Demographics 

According to the 2010 census, the town has 7,041 residents and the whole district (together with the villages) has 53,135 inhabitants. Kaş has five municipalities (Gömbe, Kalkan, Kınık, Ova and Yeşilköy) and 48 villages.

The population of inhabited places is as follows according to the 2007 census (Municipalities are shown in bold):

Places of interest 

 The town of Kaş has a Hellenistic theatre and many other places of historical interest, as well as beaches, and a number of caves, some of them underwater.
For scuba divers there are several spots underwater, one of them being an underwater sculpture of a shark sculpted by Kemal Tufan and another being a submerged Douglas DC-3 plane.
Beaches worth visiting: Kaputaş Plajı, small Seyrekcakil Plaji or Belediyesi Halk Plajı
 For sailors, a new marina with facilities for short and long stay has been opened.
 The mountains behind the coast have places for trekking, climbing and canyoning.
 The ruins of the antique cities of Komba (in the village of Gömbe), Nisa, Kandyba, Phellos, Istlada, Apollonia, Isinda and Kyaenai.
 A common excursion from Kaş is Kekova island in the neighbouring district of Demre. Here in the bays there are a number of wrecks of ancient ships and ancient cities sunk under the sea by earthquakes over the centuries. The sea is so clear that the details of city buildings such as staircases or columns can be seen from the boat. The area is also used for sea kayaking. In December 2006, Kaş was added to the specially protected Kekova marine area in order to preserve its rich biodiversity.

Panorama

See also 

 Kaputaş Beach
 Kalkan
 Turkish Riviera
 Marinas in Turkey
 Foreign purchases of real estate in Turkey
Meis–Kaş Swim

References

Sources

External links 

 Information on Kaş from Turkish Ministry of Culture and Tourism
 Link to 150 pictures that does work

 
Towns in Turkey
Turkish Riviera
Populated coastal places in Turkey
Mediterranean port cities and towns in Turkey
Populated places in Antalya Province
Fishing communities in Turkey
Districts of Antalya Province
Populated places in ancient Lycia
Former Greek towns in Turkey